Vark is an Indian confectionery garnish.

Vark may also refer to:

 Vark, Afghanistan, a village in Badakhshan Province in north-eastern Afghanistan
 Luisa Värk (born 1987), Estonian singer
 VARK, a model of learning styles
 A nickname for the F-111 Aardvark

See also
Warraq (disambiguation)